Critical closing pressure is the internal pressure at which a blood vessel collapses and  closes completely. If blood pressure falls below critical closing pressure, then the vessels collapse. This happens during the measurement of blood pressure with a sphygmomanometer. At resting state the arterial critical closing pressure is ~ 20 mmHg.

Critical closing pressure in arteries is higher than the mean vascular filling pressure that develops after death (~7 mmHg). Therefore, arteries collapse after death, then fill up with air once the dissection begins.

In severe haemorrhage, blood loss leads to a significant reduction in pressure. This, combined with activity in the sympathetic autonomic nerves supplying smooth muscle, leads to vasoconstriction to the extent that the vessels may collapse. This occurs at the critical closing pressure, closing off blood supply to tissues, which can lead to toxic shock.

Blood pressure